Christopher Bennett Reeves is a television supervising sound editor living in the Los Angeles area.  He has been awarded two Emmy Awards for his work on The X-Files and has two (1992 and 2004) Golden Reel Awards from the MPSE.  His wife, Gabrielle Reeves, is also a sound editor.

External links
 

Emmy Award winners
1958 births
Living people